Flamingo 50 was an English punk band from Liverpool. They released two albums, three EPs and four split records, and toured extensively in the UK and France.

Band members

Louise Hanman, vocals and guitar
Morgan Brown, drums and vocals
Will Fitzpatrick, bass and vocals
Karen Timms, bass and vocals 1999-2003
Laura Pye, bass 2003-2004

Discography

Singles/EPs
The Sodastream Selector Volume 1 - split w/Fabiola (Sodastream Politics)
Go Betsy Go! EP (No Concessions)
Two Birds One Stone EP (Spank Records)
split w/J Church (Los Diaper)
split w/The Measure (SA) (Ernest Jenning Recording Co.)

Albums
My Reason (2004), Keith Records
Tear It Up (2006), Ernest Jenning Recording Co.
What If Will Never Do - singles compilation (2008), Fixing A Hole

Other
Split album with Lack Of Reason
Several tracks were released on the Munkyfest compilation CDs

External links
 Official website

English punk rock groups
Musical groups from Liverpool